Celebrity Big Brother 2  is the second season of the American reality television series Celebrity Big Brother, also known as Big Brother: Celebrity Edition,  premiered on CBS on January 21, 2019 and concluded on February 13, 2019. It consisted of thirteen episodes, each approximately 60–120 minutes long, with Allison Grodner and Rich Meehan as executive producers for Fly on the Wall Entertainment, in association with Endemol Shine North America. CBS ordered the season on May 12, 2018 and confirmed it for a mid-season return when the network revealed its 2018–19 fall schedule on May 16, 2018. The network confirmed on November 27, 2018 that Julie Chen Moonves would continue her role as host despite media speculation that she may not return after her husband Les Moonves' departure from CBS Corporation due to sexual misconduct allegations against him. 

The season followed a group of celebrities, known as HouseGuests, who lived in the Big Brother House under constant surveillance with no contact from the outside world. Periodically the HouseGuests faced eviction while trying to be the last HouseGuest standing and win the grand prize. Tamar Braxton beat Ricky Williams by a unanimous jury vote during the live final. Braxton is the first African-American winner of the United States version of Big Brother, and she and Williams made up the first final two who were both African-American. Tom Green was later named America's Favorite HouseGuest.

Production 
An American version of Celebrity Big Brother had been speculated by the media since 2002 while American celebrities began appearing as Housemates on the British adaptation since its third season in 2005. The first season of the American adaptation of Celebrity Big Brother was announced on September 7, 2017 during a live double eviction episode of Big Brother 19. The first season premiered on February 7, 2018; it was scheduled as counterprogramming against the 2018 Winter Olympics airing on NBC. The series premiere was the number one program for CBS attracting 7.27 million viewers with a 1.8/7 rating in the 18–49 demographic and the highest rated season premiere since Big Brother 13. The season finale pulled in 5.21 million viewers and a 1.4/5 rating in the 18–49 demographic. CBS ordered a second season of Celebrity Big Brother on May 12, 2018 then confirmed it would return for a mid-season run four days later when the network revealed its 2018–19 fall prime-time schedule.

Crew 
Allison Grodner and Rich Meehan serve as executive producers for the second season. Their production company Fly on the Wall Entertainment will produce the season for CBS in association with Endemol Shine North America. The media speculated that Julie Chen Moonves might not continue hosting Big Brother after her husband Les Moonves' departure from CBS Corporation on September 9, 2018 because of multiple sexual misconduct allegations. Chen Moonves has been the host of the American adaption of the format since the first season of Big Brother. She subsequently stepped down as a co-host of The Talk on September 18, 2018 while continuing to host Big Brother 20. CBS confirmed on November 27, 2018 that Chen Moonves would host the second season of Celebrity Big Brother.

House 

As with each season since Big Brother 6, the program is filmed at CBS Studios, soundstage 18 in Studio City, California in a custom-built two story house. Soundstage 18 was previously used to film the sitcom Yes, Dear. The House was equipped with over 80 high-definition cameras and over 100 microphones in order to monitor and record the HouseGuests. The living room, three bedrooms, kitchen, bathroom, and lounge room are located on the first floor. The Head of Household bedroom, gym area, and an additional lounge area are located on the second floor. The second floor is accessible by a spiral staircase located in the kitchen next to the sliding glass doors that lead to the backyard. CBS released pictures and video of the redesigned House on January 16, 2019 through several media outlets like Entertainment Weekly, The Hollywood Reporter, Entertainment Tonight and ET Canada.

The interior of the Celebrity Big Brother house has a New York City theme from around the 1940s. Each of the bedrooms on the first floor were given their own individual names reflecting their design. The first bedroom has a "5th Avenue" theme inspired by window shopping highlighting "the highest fashion of the '40s" while the second bedroom has a luxury "Hotel" theme. The third bedroom, known as the "Celebrity Building" Bedroom, that was inspired by a famous art deco building named after a car company. The kitchen was inspired by some of the finest restaurants in New York City with a "faux French" oven island and a square dining room table. Behind the dining room table cartoon-style pictures of the season one HouseGuests hanging on the wall. The bathroom and downstairs lounge area were inspired by the 20th Century Limited passenger train. The Head of Household bedroom resembles the backstage of a Broadway show with the head board made from a real theater marquee. The upstairs lounge was designed after the Brooklyn Bridge, while the gym area was inspired by the 42nd Street library in Manhattan.

Broadcasts 
The main television coverage of the second season was screened on CBS during the winter of the 2018–19 network television season. The season premiere was on January 21, 2019 with the season finale airing on February 13, 2019. Alongside the weekly shows on CBS, the companion series Celebrity Big Brother: After Dark returned on Pop and to provide live coverage nightly from inside the House.

Format 
The format remains largely unchanged from the previous season. HouseGuests are incarcerated in the Big Brother House with no contact to and from the outside world. Periodically, the HouseGuests take part in several compulsory challenges that determine who would win safety and power in the House. The winner of the Head of Household (HoH) competition is immune from nominations and is instructed to nominate two fellow HouseGuests for eviction. After a HouseGuest became Head of Household, he or she was ineligible to take part in the next Head of Household competition. The winner of the Power of Veto competition wins the right to save one of the nominated HouseGuests from eviction. If the Veto winner exercised the power, the Head of Household then had to nominate another HouseGuest for eviction.

On eviction night, all HouseGuests except for the Head of Household and the nominees voted to evict one of the nominees. Before the voting began, the nominees had the chance to say a final message to their fellow HouseGuests. This compulsory vote is conducted in the privacy of the Diary Room by the host Julie Chen Moonves. In the event of a tie, the Head of Household would break the tie and reveal their vote in front of the other HouseGuests. Unlike other versions of Big Brother, the HouseGuests can discuss the nomination and eviction process open and freely. The nominee with the most votes from the other HouseGuests is evicted from the House on eviction night and interviewed by the host. HouseGuests can voluntarily leave the House at any time (referred to as "walking") and those who break the rules are expelled by Big Brother. The evictees of the season form the Jury that vote for the winner on the season finale; they are known as the jury members. Unlike the jury members of Big Brother, the celebrity jury members are not sequestered after their eviction and are able to watch the show after their eviction. The winner of Celebrity Big Brother receives the grand prize of $250,000.

Temporary changes to the regular format are known as twists. After the HouseGuests moved into the House, they were introduced to three twists on their first day. The HouseGuests had to compete in teams of two for the first Head of Household competition. However, only five teams would compete. After Kato and Natalie were not selected to compete in the Head of Household competition, the second twist was revealed when they were given immunity from the first eviction, meaning that they could not be nominated by the Head of Household for eviction. The third twist impacted the winning pair, Ryan and Jonathan, where they had to compete against each other to become the first Head of Household. Jonathan lost this part of the competition and was automatically nominated as a third nominee for eviction as a result.

Twists

"Breaking Celebrity News" twists
Julie announced during episode four that the HouseGuests will be receiving twists with the theme of "breaking celebrity news." When a twist was revealed to the HouseGuests, they would see a fake Entertainment Tonight broadcast on the television screen informing them of the twist.

Fake HouseGuest
The 24/7 internet live feeds officially opened permanently to CBS All Access subscribers in the early morning hours of January 22, 2019. Shortly after, viewers began to notice that Anthony Scaramucci was missing from the house. Some initial speculation stated that he only left temporarily due to his face on the memory wall, which is normally grayed out when a HouseGuest leaves, still being in color. These claims were later disproved when a HouseGuest questioned why his face hadn't turned black and white and another stated "I miss Anthony Scaramucci". It was assumed by many news sites that Scaramucci had walked from the game on January 21, 2019. Official reasons for his departure were left unknown at the time however one fellow HouseGuest stated that "they found out Anthony was a mole" and "not a real player" while other sources simply stated that he quit. Days later on January 23, 2019 Scaramucci appeared at a SkyBridge Capital conference in Zurich, Switzerland. In a video acquired by TMZ when Scaramucci was asked about his departure he stated that he "unfortunately signed a confidentiality agreement" and that "there’s a little bit of a cliffhanger". It was announced that more information about Scaramucci's exit would air ahead of the live eviction in the fourth episode of the season on January 25, 2019.

In the episode it was revealed that Scaramucci was a fake HouseGuest who entered the house as part of a twist. In addition, a second veto competition was played that week with the first veto winner becoming safe from eviction. In a post-departure interview with Entertainment Tonight when asked about the twist he stated that although he knew his departure date and that he was part of twist he did not know the full details until fifteen minutes before leaving. In a second interview with Entertainment Weekly Scaramucci was asked whether the twist had been planned or if it was a cover-up, he responded "I absolutely did not quit the game. The producers from day one pitched me the idea of becoming a twist in the show."

Power of the Publicist
The Power of the Publicist was a power awarded to the HouseGuest who received the most votes. This power granted one HouseGuest the ability to remove themselves off the block at one of the next two nomination or veto ceremonies. It automatically expired after the veto meeting on Day 20. In order to vote, the viewers needed to post a tweet that included a specific hashtag created by CBS that corresponded with the HouseGuest's name.

Immediately as the show went off the air, tweets started pouring in with hashtags for the show. Specifically, two hashtags started trending the most on Twitter: Joey and Tamar. #CBBTamar trended in the United States for nine hours and peaked at #2 on the trending list. #CBBJoey trended for eight hours in the United States and peaked at #5 on the trending list. Joey started trending because people were still shocked from the Ryan blindside, so they wanted to give Joey, Ryan's closest ally and the underdog, some safety. Tamar started trending because the viewers wanted the drama and entertainment to stay in the house for a few more weeks. In the end, Tamar edged out over Joey and won the Power of the Publicist.

The Power of the Publicist was never used since Tamar wasn't nominated from Day 14 to Day 18, then became ineligible to use it during her Head of Household reign from Day 19 to Day 20.

Double Eviction Safety Competition
The final twist was revealed on Day 24 during the double eviction episode. The winner of the special safety competition, Tamar, won immunity during the double eviction, but became ineligible to become Head of Household as she could not compete.

HouseGuests 

The twelve HouseGuests were announced on January 13, 2019 during a commercial break of CBS' NFL football coverage. Tom Green became the first Canadian to enter the US Big Brother house.

Future appearances
Tamar Braxton appeared in an episode of The Bold and the Beautiful on March 29, 2019. Lolo Jones competed on the thirty-sixth season of The Challenge. Tom Green returned in the seventh episode of the twenty-third season of the civilian edition to host a Head of Household Competition.

Episodes

Voting history

Notes

Viewing figures

United States

Canada

Notes

Notes

References

External links
 CBS Official Site

2019 American television seasons
Big Brother (American TV series)
United States 02